
Year 195 BC was a year of the pre-Julian Roman calendar. At the time it was known as the Year of the Consulship of Flaccus and Cato (or, less frequently, year 559 Ab urbe condita). The denomination 195 BC for this year has been used since the early medieval period, when the Anno Domini calendar era became the prevalent method in Europe for naming years.

Events 
 By place 

 Carthage 
 Because of his administrative and constitutional reforms in Carthage, Hannibal becomes unpopular with an important faction of the Carthaginian nobility and he is denounced to the Romans for inciting the Seleucid king Antiochus III to take up arms against the Romans. Rome demands that Carthage surrender Hannibal. However, Hannibal voluntarily goes into exile.

 Seleucid Empire 
 Tensions between Antiochus III and Rome increase when Hannibal is given refuge by Antiochus III at Ephesus and becomes his adviser.
 After Roman diplomatic intervention, Antiochus III finally halts his war with Egypt. In the peace agreement (the Peace of Lysimachia), Antiochus III formally takes possession of southern Syria, which has been fought over for 100 years by the Ptolemies and Seleucids, and also takes possession of the Egyptian territories in Anatolia.

 Roman Republic 
 A Spanish revolt against Roman consolidation of the ex-Carthaginian colonies is effectively put down by Marcus Porcius Cato ("the Censor"). He avoids one defeat by paying the Celtiberians 200 talents (around 120,000 denarii), a much-criticised tactic. On Cato's return to Rome, Aemilius Paulus succeeds him as Roman governor in Spain.
 The Roman sumptuary law, the Lex Oppia, which restricts not only a woman's wealth, but also her display of wealth, is repealed despite consul Marcus Porcius Cato's strong opposition.

 Greece 
 The Battle of Gythium is fought between Sparta and a coalition of Rome, Rhodes, the Achaean League and Pergamum. As the port of Gythium is an important Spartan base, the allies decide to capture it before they advance inland to Sparta. The Romans and the Acheans are joined outside the city by the Pergamese and Rhodian fleets. The Spartans hold out, however the pro-consul Titus Quinctius Flamininus arrives with 4,000 extra men. Facing too great an army, the Spartans decide to surrender the city on the condition that the garrison can leave unharmed. As a result, Nabis, the tyrant of Sparta, is forced to abandon the surrounding land and withdraw to the city of Sparta. Later that year, Sparta capitulates to the allies.

 Egypt 
 Aristophanes of Byzantium, Greek scholar, critic and grammarian, becomes the chief librarian at Alexandria.

 China 
 Facing the suspicion of Emperor Gaozu of Han, Lu Wan, the king of the State of Yan, flees north of the Great Wall of China. 
 Gaozu sends general Fan Kuai to seek out Lu Wan but then arrests the general on suspicion of planning to murder Consort Qi and her son to Gaozu, Liu Ruyi. Gaozu dies soon after, and Fan's sister-in-law Empress Lü orders his release.
 Chang'an, the capital of China, is thought to become the largest city in the world at this time, taking over from Pataliputra, the capital of the Mauryan empire.

 Korea 
 Haemosu Dangun, the first ruler of Buyeo, dies and his son Mosuri Dangun succeeds him to the throne.

Births 
 Mithridates I (or Mithradates), "Great King" of Parthia from about 171 BC who turned Parthia into a major political power and expanded the empire westward into Mesopotamia (d. 138 BC)
 Terence or Publius Terentius Afer, Roman comic playwright (approximate date) (d. 159 BC)

Deaths 
 June 1 – Gaozu of Han (or Gao), first Emperor of the Chinese  Han Dynasty, who has ruled since 202 BC (b. 256 or 247 BC)

References